Albert Bessler (15 February 1905 – 4 December 1975) was a German film actor. He appeared in 40 films between 1942 and 1975. He was born in Hamburg, Germany and died in West Berlin, West Germany.

Partial filmography

 Front Theatre (1942) - Ein Offizier (uncredited)
 Berliner Ballade (1948) - (uncredited)
 The Blue Swords (1949) - Finanzminister
 The Perfect Couple (1954)
 Confess, Doctor Corda (1958) - Dr. Dollheubel
 Restless Night (1958)
 Majestät auf Abwegen (1958) - Filmdirektor
 Aus dem Tagebuch eines Frauenarztes (1959) - Landgerichtsdirektor
 Menschen im Hotel (1959) - Dr. Altendorfer (uncredited)
 The Death Ship (1959) - US-Konsul
 The High Life (1960) - Monsieur Onyx
 Sweetheart of the Gods (1960) - Ministerialrat
 The Avenger (1960) - Zeitungsmann
 Brainwashed (1960) - Scientist
 The Thousand Eyes of Dr. Mabuse (1960) - Hotel-Ingenieur
 Carnival Confession (1960) - Dr. Classen
 The Young Sinner (1960) - Scharwitz
 The Last Witness (1960) - Dr. Hollberg
 Blind Justice (1961) - Empfangschef
 The Return of Dr. Mabuse (1961) - Trödler
 The Strange Countess (1961) - Gefängnisdirektor Duffon (uncredited)
 Ich kann nicht länger schweigen (1962) - Sachverständiger
 Eheinstitut Aurora (1962) - Charles, Diener
 Das Geheimnis der schwarzen Koffer (1962) - Harris (uncredited)
 Das Testament des Dr. Mabuse (1962) - Joe - Paragraphen
 The Squeaker (1963) - Butler James
 The Strangler of Blackmoor Castle (1963) - Sebastian - the Gardener
 Scotland Yard Hunts Dr. Mabuse (1963) - Konservator
 Der Henker von London (1963)
 Piccadilly Zero Hour 12 (1963) - Skinny
 Frozen Alive (1964) - Martin, lab tech.
 Neues vom Hexer (1965) - Vorsitzender bei Gericht (uncredited)
 Tierra de fuego (1965) - Reverendo Dean
  (1966, TV Mini-Series) - Dr. Swanson
 Long Legs, Long Fingers (1966) - Richter
 The Hunchback of Soho (1966) - Butler Anthony
 Creature with the Blue Hand (1967) - Butler Anthony
 Death and Diamonds (1968) - Butler
 Sie sind frei, Doktor Korczak (1974)
 Derrick (1975, Episode 10: "Kamillas junger Freund") - Marczek

References

External links

1905 births
1975 deaths
German male film actors
Male actors from Hamburg
20th-century German male actors